Jonchets or onchets is a pick-up sticks game from France played with carved sticks. References to the game date back as far as the 17th century, and it was quite popular at the start of the 20th century. The sticks were originally made of rush, but later also from wood, bone or ivory.

The sticks are thrown on a table, and the rules of play are likely similar to pick-up sticks. In jonchets, some sticks may have carved heads that denote different point values.

{| class=wikitable
|-
! Name    !! Value     !! Number of the sticks
|-
| King    ||align=right| 50 points ||align=center| 1 stick
|-
| Queen   ||align=right| 40 points ||align=center| 1 stick
|-
| Flag    ||align=right| 30 points ||align=center| 1 stick
|-
| Servant ||align=right| 20 points ||align=center| 4 sticks
|-
| Rider   ||align=right| 10 points ||align=center| 8 sticks
|-
| Soldier ||align=right|  5 points ||align=center| 15–25 sticks
|}

Mikado is a simplified variation that may have been directly inspired by jonchets.

"Jonchets" were the name of a stick abacus calcus form in France with Asian background.

References

Games of physical skill